Abu Al-Hasan Taqī al-Dīn Ali ibn Abd al-Kafi ibn Ali al-Khazraji al-Ansari al-Subkī, was a leading polymath and renowned Shafi'i jurisconsult,  traditionist, Qur'anic exegete, legal theorist, theologian, mystic, grammarian, linguist, rhetorician, historian, philologist, and chief judge of Damascus.

He was regarded as one of the most influential and highly acclaimed scholars of the Mamaluk period. He was famous for being the leading judge and teacher of his time. He was universally recognized as a mujtahid. He was given the special title of Sheikh al-Islam for mastering every Islamic science and was a prolific writer who wrote books in every field. He was said to have extensive knowledge in all four Sunni schools of jurisprudence where he issued fatwas outside of his school.

Biography

Birth
Sheikh Taqi al-Din al-Subki was born on the beginning of Safar in the year 683 AH which corresponds to April 18, 1284 AD in the village of Subk al-Ahad (hence the name "Al-Subki") – one of the villages in the Monufia Governorate ​​and he was taught in his childhood by his father, who provided him with the appropriate atmosphere for acquiring knowledge.

Education
He moved with his father to Cairo, where he was apprenticed to a number of notables of his time, headed by his father, Sheikh Abd al-Kafi al-Subki, and he was one of the deputies of Sheikh al-Islam Ibn Daqiq al-'Id in the judiciary, and he took great care of him to devote himself to seeking knowledge. He also travelled to acquire knowledge of hadith from the scholars of Syria, Alexandria and the Hijaz.

Teachers
He studied under the leading scholars of his time and mastered these sacred sciences under them:

 Ibn Daqiq al-'Id who taught him Fiqh and Usul al-Fiqh
 Al-Mizzi who taught him Hadith
 Abu Hayyan al-Gharnati who taught him grammar
 Ibn Ata Allah al-Iskandari who taught him Tasawwuf
 Alam al-Din al-Iraqi who taught him Qu'ran exegesis
 Safi al-Din al-Hindi who taught him Kalam

Chief Judge of Syria and Teaching career 
Having left Egypt in his youth, al-Subkī settled down in Syria where he rose through the ranks to the position of chief judge of Syria for 17 years, the preacher of the Umayyad mosque at Damascus and a professor in several colleges. He taught in prestigious institutions such as the Mansuriyya school located in the Ibn Tulun's mosque and he became the headmaster of the Dar al-Ḥadīth al-Ashrafiyya, which was the world's leading Hadith academy centered in Damascus

Students
Al-Subki had plenty of students with some becoming prominent scholars of their time and his most famous students were:
 Taj al-Din al-Subki (leading polymath of his time)
 Zain al-Din al-'Iraqi (leading muhaddith of his time)
 Siraj al-Din al-Bulqini (leading Shafi'i jurist of his time)
 Ibn al-Mulaqqin (one of the leading Hadith scholar and Shafi'i jurist of his time)
 Jamal al-Din al-Isnawi (renowned Shafi'i jurist and Muffassir of his time)
 Al-Safadi (major historian of his time)

Death
Imam Taqi al-Din al-Sabki was tyrannized by illness, and weakness began in him in the year 755 AH , and the situation continued with his illness in Damascus until his son, Imam Taj al-Din Abd al-Wahhab bin Ali al-Subki, was appointed as his successor. 

On the night of Monday, the third of Jumada al-Akhirah in the year 756 AH, Sheikh Taqi al-Din al-Subki died at the age of 73. Then a herald called out in the city that the last of the mujtahids had died, the scholar of time died, then the scholars carried his coffin, tens of thousands of people crowded and marched with him until he was buried in the cemetery of Saeed Al-Saada outside Bab Al-Nasr.

Views 
Al-Subki staunchly defended the mainstream Sunni beliefs against the extremist minority and their heresy. Al-Subki belonged to the Sunni theological school of Ash'ari and in line with his school strongly opposed anthropomorphism. He also vehemently defended the Ashari view that Paradise and Hell Fire are eternal and to that end wrote a comprehensive treatise entitled "Al-I'tibar" in which he stated that: "The doctrine of the Muslims is that the Garden and the Fire will not pass away. Abu Muhammad ibn Hazm has transmitted that this is held by consensus and that whoever opposes it is an unbeliever by consensus". Subkī reiterates this elsewhere in the treatise although he is careful to clarify that he does not label any particular person an unbeliever. Al-Subki blamed Ibn Taymiyyah's misguidance for not learning the proper interpretation of classical texts from qualified transmitters. He was very harsh in criticizing Taymiyyah for deviating the Sunni community and distorting fundamental principles of the true Islamic creed. Al-Subki regarded him as one of the members of the Hashwiyya sect (an anthropomorphic sect that attribute God with direction, form and image).   

Taqi al-Din al-Subi was completely against philosophy and attempted to ban it from being taught. He also opposed the use of forbidden logic in the Islamic sciences. He was very critical and wrote refutation against anything he deemed as innovation.

Reception
Ibn Hajar al-Haytami said about him: “the mujtahid Imam whose imamate, greatness, and having reached the level of ijtihad are agreed upon,” and by Al-Dhahabi as “the most learned, eloquent, and wisest in judgement of all the sheikhs of the age.”

Al-Suyuti said about him:
“He devoted himself to writing and giving legal opinion, authoring more than 150 works, his writings displaying his profound knowledge of hadith and other fields and his magisterial command of the Islamic sciences. He educated the foremost scholars of his time, was a painstaking, accurate, and penetrating researcher, and a brilliant debater in the disciplines. No previous scholar attained to his achievements in Sacred Law, of masterful inferences, subtleties in detail, and carefully worked-out methodological principles.”

Al-Safadi said about him
“People say that no one like him had appeared since Ghazali, though in my opinion they thereby do him an injustice, for to my mind he does not resemble anyone less than Sufyan al-Thawri.” With his vast erudition, he was at the same time a godfearing ascetic in his personal life who was devoted to worship and mysticism, though vigilant and uncompromising in matters of religion and ready to assail any innovation (bid’a) or departure from the tenets of faith of Ahl al-Sunna.

Al-Suyuti also said about him:
“The Imam, the jurist (Faqih), the traditionist (Muhaddith), the Hafidh, the exegete (Mufassir), the legal theorist (Usuli), the theologian (Mutkallim), the grammarian (Nahwi), the linguist (Lughawi), the writer (Adib), the Mujtahid Taqi al-Din Abul Hasan ‘Ali bin ‘Abd al-Kafi bin ‘Ali bin Tammam bin Yusuf bin Musa bin Tammam bin Hamid bin Yahya bin ‘Umar bin ‘Uthman bin ‘Ali bin Miswar bin Sawwar bin Salim, the Shaykh al-Islam and Imam of [his] era.”

His son Taj al-Din al-Subki said:"The people's leader who assembled all branches of knowledge. The distinctive [master] of his days. Ascending to incomputable heights. He wrote exegesis of the Qu'ran, in which he demonstrated that the source of knowledge handed over his guidance to him. In the Field of Hadith (the Prophet's maxima), caravans of those who seek valuable knowledge travelled to him from all over. In the subjects of the principles of Islamic jurisprudence (usul) he recorded excellency and in the branches of Islamic law (fiqh) he was extremely energetic. In the field of Arabic linguistics, throughout the universe he always served as a model. He comprehended philology, noun's and verb's declinations, and grammar. His poetic compositions were the best. He mastered genealogy and history, and the most obscure situations he understood assuredly. Eloquently he interpreted complex texts, and produced clear interpretations. In prosody, rhymes and istidlal, he did not encounter difficulty. In religious logic as well as in all other topics,  he was the most knowledgeable, the instructor and the mentor."

Works
He left a large number of books, amounting to about (211) books in every field of Sharia sciences, some of which are printed and some that are still in manuscript form. Among his most important books are:
 Shifa' as-Siqam fi Ziarat khayr al'Anam - 'Cure for the Sick in Visiting the Best of Mankind' archive.org (in Arabic) 
 Al-Sayf al-Saqil fi al-Radd ala Ibn Zafil - Refutation of Ibn al-Qayyim
 Al-Durra al-Mudiyya fi al-Radd 'ala Ibn Taymiyya - Refutation to Ibn Taymiyya
 al-'Itibār bī baqā' al-janat wa'l-nār fi ar-rad 'ala ibn Taymiyah wa ibn al-Qiyam al-Qayilin bī fana' an-Nār. - Contemplation of the eternity of Paradise and Hell, A response to Ibn Taymiyah and Ibn al-Qayyim on the temporality of Hell.
 Naqid al-‘Ijtimā’ wa’l-‘Iftirāq fī Masā’il al'Aymān wa’t-Talāq - 'Critique of Communion and Separation in Matters of Faith and Divorce.'
 Al-'Ashbāh wa’n-Naẓā’r - 'Analogues and Pairs' (in Arabic, 3 vols)
 Ibraz al-Hukam min hadīth rafa' al-Qalam - 'Illustration of ruling in hadith "Raising the Pen"'.
 Aintiqad Alliqa' Wliainfisal fi Masail al-Imam Waltalaqi (Criticism of meeting and separation in matters of faith and divorce)
 Itharat al-Fitnat fi 'Amr Altalaq (Raising discord in the matter of divorce)
 Shifa' al-Ghathayan fi Zirat khayr alnas (Healing sickness in visiting the best of people)
 Sayf Laen al-Rasul (The sword of the one who cursed the Messenger)
 Bayan Hakam Hadith Rafai al-Qalama (Highlighting the ruling from the hadeeth of raising the pen)
 Ahkam Kuli Ma Yushir 'Ilayhi (The provisions of all that it indicates)
 Bahjatan fi Sharh Tariqat al-Wusul 'ila Ilm al Usul Lilqadi Nasayr Aldiyn Al-Baydawi (Exhilaration in explaining the method on the method of access to the science of origins by Judge Nasir al-Din al-Baydawi)
 Al-Majmoo, Sharh al-Muadab, Walfarah fi Sharh Manhaj al'Iman Muhyi Aldiyn Al-Nawawi (Al-Majmoo', the explanation of the polite, and the joy in explaining the method of Imam Muhyi al-Din al-Nawawi)
 Al-Hamasat al-Wadihat Lil'Iman Li Abu Bakr Wa Umar Wa Uthman Wa Ali (The clear zeal of faith for Abu Bakr, Umar, Uthman and Ali)
 Sabab Aliamtinai an Qira'at al-Kishafati (The reason for refraining from reading the scout)
 Thulathiaat al-Musnad Al-Dirmi (Triads Musnad Al-Dirmi)
 Bayan al'Ithbat fi 'Ithbat al-Hilal (Statement of evidence in proving the crescent)

See also 
 List of Ash'aris and Maturidis
 List of Muslim theologians
 List of Sufis

References 

1284 births
1355 deaths
13th-century Arabs
14th-century Arabs
Asharis
Shafi'is
Shaykh al-Islāms
Sunni fiqh scholars
Sunni Muslim scholars of Islam
Sunni imams
Sunni Sufis
Egyptian Sufis
Egyptian imams
Egyptian Sunni Muslim scholars of Islam
Hadith scholars
Quranic exegesis scholars
Critics of Ibn Taymiyya
Critics of Ibn al-Qayyim
Logicians
14th-century Muslim theologians
Theologians from the Mamluk Sultanate
Supporters of Ibn Arabi